This page lists some names of places in Belarus, as they are called in two of the official languages (Belarusian, Russian) and in other languages spoken by ethnic groups which are or have been represented within Belarusian territory.

Cities

Minsk Region

Brest Region

Homiel Region

Hrodna Region

Mahiloŭ Region

Viciebsk Region

See also
History of Belarus
Jews in Belarus
Polish minority in Belarus

References 

Exonyms
 
Places in other languages
Alternative names of European places